Mohammed-Awal Issah (born 4 April 1986) is a Ghanaian former professional footballer who played as a defensive midfielder.

Club career
Issah began his career by Real Sportive before signing a two-year contract with AmaZulu in the South African PSL in August 2007.

On 10 October 2008, he went to Serbia for trials with Red Star Belgrade and in December 2008, he signed a 4.5-year contract with the club. In mid-May 2009, AmaZulu contacted FIFA stating they had not received the full transfer fee for Issah from Red Star Belgrade. Later that month, Issah, together with teammate and compatriot Bernard Parker sued Red Star Belgrade for failing to fulfil financial obligations. In January 2011, Issah was one of eight players told they were surplus to requirements.

In the 2011 summer transfer window, Issah signed for Norwegian club Rosenborg BK.

On 25 January 2013, Issah joined Greek Super League club Veria F.C. on a 1.5-year loan contract. After half a season, the loan was terminated.

On 1 August 2013, Issah re-joined AmaZulu after almost five years in European football while AmaZulu agreed a transfer deal with Rosenborg. In February 2014, the club reported him to the South African Football Association claiming he had disappeared. Two months later, Issah was fined $170,000 for going absent and received a four-month playing ban.

International career
Issah was a member of the Ghana national under-20 team at the 2007 Toulon Tournament.

Career statistics

Club

Honours
Red Star
 Serbian Cup: 2010

References

External links
 

1986 births
Living people
Footballers from Accra
Association football midfielders
Ghanaian footballers
Super League Greece players
Serbian SuperLiga players
AmaZulu F.C. players
Expatriate soccer players in South Africa
Red Star Belgrade footballers
Rosenborg BK players
Real Sportive players
Veria F.C. players
Ghanaian expatriate footballers
Ghanaian expatriate sportspeople in South Africa
Ghanaian expatriate sportspeople in Serbia
Expatriate footballers in Norway
Expatriate footballers in Serbia
Expatriate footballers in Greece
Ghanaian expatriate sportspeople in Norway
Ghanaian expatriate sportspeople in Greece